Angel Dust is a 1994 psychological crime horror film directed by Japanese filmmaker Gakuryū Ishii. It stars Kaho Minami as a forensic psychiatrist who is brought in by the police to help stop a serial killer who strikes on a crowded Tokyo subway once a week.  

The film has received positive reviews, with praise for its direction, cinematography, musical score, and performances.

Plot 

Forensic psychiatrist Dr. Setsuko Suma is called in by the Tokyo Metropolitan Police Department to assist in solving a case of serial murders occurring in the Tokyo subway. The last two Mondays, at 6 pm, a seemingly random young woman was killed on a crowded train - injected with a hypodermic needle containing deadly rhodotoxin. Setsuko is known as an expert in abnormal criminal cases, as she has the ability to assimilate the thoughts and emotions of perpetrators by interacting with the bodies of the victims. After examining the bodies of the subway victims, she believes that they were chosen because they had strong feelings of self-destruction and isolation - emotions that they shared with the killer.

Setsuko suspects that the killer knew the first victim, a student named Yumiko, personally, as she was the only one who was injected in the back instead of in the front. Setsuko learns that Yumiko was a former member of a cult called the Ultimate Truth Church and that she was deprogrammed at a mountain facility called the Re-Freezing Psychorium. This facility is run by the disgraced psychiatrist Dr. Rei Aku, who is Setsuko's former lover. Aku's "reverse brainwashing" techniques have been very controversial, being called "unscientific" and being compared to mind control. Setsuko goes to visit Aku to ask for information on Yumiko, but he refuses her.

The murders continue happening, but now they take place outside of the subway system, on residential streets and in urban areas. Setsuko begins to feel paranoid and restless after she receives a call from Aku, telling her that because of her research, the killer's mind will start to manifest itself inside of her. She goes back to visit Aku again, suspecting that he is involved with the murders. This is based on clues, such as his color blindness linking him to the red clothing worn by all the victims, and by the letter A being formed by a map marking the crime sites. Setsuko also believes that Aku's sense of isolation is similar to the one felt by the victims. She accuses him of being heartless and manipulative during their relationship, while he says that his feelings of love toward her have not changed.

When Setsuko leaves, Aku watches old tapes of his which focus on the deprogramming of a cult member named Yuki. As a child, Yuki experienced the death of her mother and blames herself for it. Her mother had fallen into a pit, and though Yuki was trying to help her out, she was stung by a bee, forcing her to let go of her mother's hand.

The next Monday at 6 PM, Setsuko stalks the subway station in order to prevent another murder but collapses after seeing Aku approach her. During her recovery, she dreams of Aku and receives a call from him, telling her to come to the Re-Freezing Psychorium. Aku tells her that she is under his control and that she wants to be with him, despite her denial. When Setsuko arrives at the facility, she is locked in a room with a television screen playing a looped recording of Aku mocking her free will. This prolonged captivity drives Setsuko mad and makes her believe that the murders are her fault for leaving Aku. She is forced to tell Aku that she loves him, and after that, Yuki enters the room. Setsuko escapes through the unlocked door, but when she returns home, she finds that her husband, Tomoo, has been killed. During the autopsy, it is discovered that Tomoo was intersex. Setsuko tells the police that all of the killings were committed by her and Aku, and she is confined to a psychiatric hospital. Aku has disappeared and cannot be located.

While she is being transferred to another hospital, Setsuko is kidnapped by Aku. When she wakes up in his facility, he prepares to kill her, but she defends herself by stabbing him with a knife. Yuki enters the room, revealing herself to be the one behind the subway murders. She is angry at Aku for his manipulative brainwashing and attempts to kill both him and Setsuko with her needle. Aku subdues her and then convinces her to kill herself by evoking her childhood trauma, saving Setsuko in the process. He then reveals that the story about Yuki's mother's death was not real; he implanted it in Yuki's mind in order to control the murderous compulsions that she had inside of her. These false memories backfired and turned Yuki into a serial killer who uses needles to "sting" her victims.

The police arrive and Yuki is declared the perpetrator of the serial murders. With a blank expression, Setsuko rests in Aku's arms, now completely devoted to him. Aku smiles.

Cast

Release
The film premiered in Japan on September 23, 1994. It premiered in the United States on January 24, 1997.

Critical reception
Angel Dust has received positive reviews. Stephen Holden of The New York Times praised the atmosphere, cinematography, and soundtrack of the film, though criticized the ending. David Rooney of Variety said the plot is "at times on the fuzzy side," but Ishii "keeps the heady brew cooking, exercising a steely fascination that doesn’t let up." He also complimented the editing, acting, and camerawork in the film. Richard Scheib of Moria Reviews gave Angel Dust three-and-a-half stars, calling it a "beautifully composed and serenely cool film". He compared the film to The Silence of the Lambs and praised the journey of the main heroine, although criticizing the execution of the overarching plot.

Michael Hewis of Cinema of the Abstract described the film as "an incredibly unsettling psychological horror film which creeps you out to the end" and cited similarities to other crime thriller films, such as Se7en and Manhunter. Hewis praised the atmosphere and setting of the film and also complimented the dreamlike quality to its storytelling. Marc Savlov of The Austin Chronicle said Angel Dust is "that rare avis, a cat-and-mouse thriller that lives up to -- and surpasses -- expectations." He praised Ishii's "crazed, shock-cut editing, surreal cinematography, and bombastic use of high-decibel industrial music," saying that the style creates an "infectious new twist" on the old "serial-killer subgenre."

References

Sources

External links

 
 エンジェル・ダスト (1994) at allcinema 
 エンジェル・ダスト at KINENOTE 

1990s Japanese films
1994 films
Films directed by Sōgo Ishii
1994 crime thriller films
1994 horror films
1990s Japanese-language films
1990s psychological thriller films
Japanese horror films
Japanese crime thriller films
Japanese neo-noir films
Police detective films
Japanese serial killer films
Japanese police films